Tubipora is a genus of soft coral. It is the only genus within the monotypic family Tubiporidae.

Species 
The following species are recognized:

 Tubipora chamissonis Ehrenberg, 1834
 Tubipora fimbriata Dana, 1846
 Tubipora hemprichi Ehrenberg, 1834
 Tubipora musica Linnaeus, 1758 — Organ pipe coral
 Tubipora reptans Carter
 Tubipora rubeola Quoy & Gaimard, 1833
 Tubipora syringa Dana, 1846

References 

Tubiporidae
Animals described in 1758
Taxa named by Carl Linnaeus
Octocorallia genera